Innocence Unprotected is a compilation film by Yugoslav director Dušan Makavejev. Makavejev's film is based on the 1941 film Nevinost bez zaštite in Serbia by Dragoljub Aleksić that was never released. In 1968, Makavejev established the film and expanded it with newsreel footage and interviews with surviving cast members.

Production
Innocence Unprotected is composed of footage of the 1941 film of the same name. Innocence Unprotected was originally filmed in 1941 under the title Nevinost bez zaštite which was meant to be the first sound feature film made in Serbia. Nevinost bez zaštite was made by the Yugoslav gymnast Dragoljub Aleksić, who wrote, produced, directed, and starred in the film. Nevinost bez zaštite was never released due to the Nazi censors while ironically later during the Yugoslav communist period some accused and condemned it as being pro-Nazi.

In 1968 filmmaker Dušan Makavejev found the film and expanded upon it with newsreel footage of Nazi propaganda and German occupation as well. Other footage includes Aleksić performing his acrobatics and filmed interviews of the surviving cast members. Makavejev tinted some of the black and white scenes in the film and hand colored some details. The film was referred to by Makavejev as a "montage of attractions", with a montage styled celebration of Serbian customs, folklore, and humor.

Reception
The film was entered into the 1968 Berlin International Film Festival, and it won the Silver Bear Extraordinary Prize of the Jury.

The film received positive acclaim on its initial release. Variety wrote that the film is "both amusing and interesting. It has value as a documentary but it also gives the viewer the chance to laugh at an old amateur feature pic".

Roger Greenspun of The New York Times wrote that, Makavejev "brings an exceptionally sophisticated understanding to his project. But it is also an exceptionally understanding sophistication—ironic, loving, clear-sightedly appreciative of all illusions. For this, rarer than most things on film, I value Makavejev's extraordinary insights into ordinary affairs and his gentle juggling act with Acrobat Aleksic."

Later reviews were also positive. In 1985, Don Druker of The Chicago Reader wrote that the film is "funny and genuinely endearing tribute to an innocent folk hero—bizarre in spots, and definitely Makavejev".

References

External links

 
 
 

1968 films
Yugoslav avant-garde and experimental films
Films directed by Dušan Makavejev
Serbian black-and-white films
Yugoslav black-and-white films
Compilation films
Films set in Serbia
Silver Bear Grand Jury Prize winners
Films set in Yugoslavia
Films shot in Serbia
Cultural depictions of Yugoslav people
Serbo-Croatian-language films